The Gainesville Metropolitan Statistical Area, as defined by the United States Census Bureau, is an area consisting of one county – Hall – in the state of Georgia.  As of the 2010 census, the MSA had a population of 179,684 (though a July 1, 2016 estimate placed the population at 196,637).

The Gainesville Metropolitan Statistical Area is also part of the larger Atlanta–Sandy Springs–Gainesville, Georgia Combined Statistical Area.

Counties
Hall

Communities

Cities
City of Buford (partial)
City of Flowery Branch
City of Gainesville (Principal city)
City of Gillsville (partial)
City of Lula (partial)
City of Oakwood

Towns
Town of Braselton (partial)
Town of Clermont
Town of Rest Haven (partial)

See also

Georgia census statistical areas

References

Metropolitan areas of Georgia (U.S. state)
Geography of Hall County, Georgia